Vashnam-e Dust Mohammad (also Romanized as Vashnām-e Dūst Moḩammad and Veshnām-e Dūst Moḩammad; also known as Rezhnān, Vājnān, Vashnām, Vāzhnān, and Wajnān) is a village in Kambel-e Soleyman Rural District, in the Central District of Chabahar County, Sistan and Baluchestan Province, Iran. At the 2006 census, its population was 52, in 12 families.

References 

Populated places in Chabahar County